The 1983 IBF World Championships (World Badminton Championships) were held in Copenhagen, Denmark, in 1983. The gold medal was won by Icuk Sugiarto; the silver by Liem Swie King; and the bronze by Prakash Padukone and Han Jian. What follows are the detailed results of the men's singles.

Main stage

Section 1

Section 2

Section 3

Section 4

Final stage

External links 
 First round - Teil 2
 Second round
 Third round
 Quarterfinals

1983 IBF World Championships